George Nkwe (fl. 1866) was the first Cameroonian pastor,
ordained in 1866 by British Baptist missionary Alfred Saker.
A native Bamileke, Nkwe was kidnapped and sold into slavery at a young age, eventually becoming a slave of King Mpondo Ngando Akwa II of the Duala.

References 

Cameroonian clergy
Cameroonian Baptists
Year of death unknown
Year of birth unknown
19th-century Baptist ministers